Western Australian soccer clubs competed in 2019 for the Football West State Cup, known for sponsorship reasons as the Belt Up State Cup. Clubs entered from the National Premier Leagues WA, the two divisions of the State League, a limited number of teams from various divisions of the 2019 Amateur League, Metropolitan League and Masters League competitions, and from regional teams from the South West and Great Southern regions.

This knockout competition was won by Floreat Athena, their seventh title.

The competition also served as the Western Australian Preliminary Rounds for the 2019 FFA Cup. The two finalists – Bayswater City and Floreat Athena – qualified for the final rounds, entering at the Round of 32.

Format

Preliminary rounds

A total of 56 teams took part in the competition, from Perth-based and regional-based competitions.

Final
The 2019 State Cup Final was played on 20 July 2019, at the neutral venue of Dorrien Gardens.

References

Football West State Cup
WA State Cup